Ryan Meikle ( born 13 August 1996) is an English professional darts player who plays in events of the Professional Darts Corporation (PDC).

Career
Born in Ipswich, Suffolk, Meikle is a barber by trade, hence his nickname of "The Barber". He won a PDC Pro Tour card by qualifying from the second day of Q School in 2016.

He made his PDC European Tour debut in the 2016 International Darts Open in Riesa, Germany, where he whitewashed Austrian Michael Rasztovits 6–0 thanks to an opening 151 checkout. He was scheduled to play world number one Michael van Gerwen in the next round, but an ankle injury forced Van Gerwen to withdraw, giving Meikle a bye to round three, where he lost 6–2 to Yordi Meeuwisse.

In 2018, he won his second PDC Development Tour title, defeating Rowby-John Rodriguez 5–3 in the final of Development Tour 11 in Wigan.

Meikle made the semi-finals of the 2019 PDC World Youth Championship but lost 6–3 to Adam Gawlas.

World Championship results

PDC
 2020: First round (lost to Yuki Yamada 1–3)
 2021: First round (lost to Keegan Brown 0–3)
 2022: Second round (lost to Peter Wright 0–3)
 2023: Second round (lost to Raymond van Barneveld 1–3)

Performance timeline

PDC European Tour

References

External links

1996 births
Living people
Sportspeople from Ipswich
English darts players
Professional Darts Corporation current tour card holders
21st-century English people